Chateaugay Correctional Facility (ASACTC) was a medium-security prison and state alcohol and substance abuse Correctional Treatment Center in Franklin County, New York, United States.  The prison is in the town of Chateaugay.

Chateaugay C.F., along with other upstate facilities, provide employment in an otherwise depressed economy.

The prison opened in 1990. What used to be known as an ASACTC correctional program has now turned into a facility for repeat parole violators as of the mid-2000s. No new prisoners are sent there anymore, just parole violators.

Chateaugay closed on July 26, 2014.

See also  
 List of New York state prisons

References

External links  
  Development of the Chateaugay Correctional Facility (ASACTC)

Buildings and structures in Franklin County, New York
Defunct prisons in New York (state)
2014 disestablishments in New York (state)
1990 establishments in New York (state)